In baseball statistics, an error is an act, in the judgment of the official scorer, of a fielder misplaying a ball in a manner that allows a batter or baserunner to advance one or more bases or allows an at bat to continue after the batter should have been put out. The catcher is a position for a baseball or softball player. When a batter takes his/her turn to hit, the catcher crouches behind home plate, in front of the (home) umpire, and receives the ball from the pitcher. In addition to these primary duties, the catcher is also called upon to master many other skills in order to field the position well. The role of the catcher is similar to that of the wicket-keeper in cricket. In the numbering system used to record defensive plays, the catcher is assigned the number 2.

The list of career leaders is dominated by players from the 19th century, when fielding equipment was very rudimentary; baseball gloves only began to steadily gain acceptance in the 1880s, and were not uniformly worn until the mid-1890s, resulting in a much lower frequency of defensive miscues. Other protective equipment for catchers was also gradually introduced; the first masks were developed in the late 1870s, with improvements in the 1890s, but shin guards were not introduced to the major leagues until 1907. The top 15 players in career errors all played primarily in the 19th century, and half of the top 52 played their entire careers prior to 1894; only five were active after 1920, and none were active after 1931. To a large extent, the leaders reflect longevity rather than lower skill; of the six catchers in the top 100 who were active after 1960, most were winners of Gold Glove Awards; Bob Boone, who leads all post-1931 catchers with 178 errors, won seven Gold Glove Awards for defensive excellence.

Pop Snyder, who retired in 1891 with a record 877 games as a catcher, is the all-time leader in career fielding errors by a catcher with 685, nearly four times as many as any catcher who began their career after 1915. Deacon McGuire, who ended his career in 1912 with a record 1,612 games caught, is second with 577, and is the only other catcher to commit more than 500 errors. Yadier Molina, who had 80 errors through the 2021 season to place him tied for 210th all-time, is the leader among active players.

Key

List

Other Hall of Famers

References

Baseball-Reference.com

Major League Baseball statistics
Major League Baseball lists